Martin Gordon DeMerritt (born March 4, 1953) is an American professional baseball coach and a former minor league pitcher. In , he spent his sixth straight season as the pitching coach of the Rookie-level GCL Rays of the Gulf Coast League.  He served two different terms in Major League Baseball as a coach for the San Francisco Giants (1989) and Chicago Cubs (1999).

Born in San Francisco, DeMerritt graduated from South San Francisco High School and was selected by the St. Louis Cardinals in the 22nd round of the 1971 Major League Baseball draft. His active career, plagued by a sore arm, lasted six seasons (1971; 1973–77) in the Cardinals, Milwaukee Brewers and Houston Astros organizations, peaking at the Double-A level. Out of professional baseball at age 25, he worked in construction and as a bounty-hunter in California. He also coached in youth baseball in the San Francisco Bay area. In the early 1980s he was hired as a minor league pitching coach by his hometown Giants, and spent a brief period as a staff assistant with the MLB club in 1989, but eventually became the major league pitching coach for the Giants in 1989. He also coached in South Korea and in winter ball in Venezuela. DeMerritt was the first American to serve as a pitching coach in Korea.

He joined the Florida Marlins expansion team in 1992 as a pitching coach for their minor-league affiliates between 1992–94, before moving to the Cubs as a minor league coach (1995–98, including two years in Triple-A).

In 2001, the Tampa Bay Devil Rays hired DeMerritt as a pitching coach at the Class A level, and he has remained in the Rays' system since, working with pitchers at the lower levels of the minors for 18 seasons.

References

External links

1953 births
Living people
People from South San Francisco, California
Baseball players from San Francisco
Burlington Bees players
Chicago Cubs coaches
Columbus Astros players
Danville Warriors players
Dubuque Packers players
Gulf Coast Cardinals players
Major League Baseball pitching coaches
Minor league baseball coaches
San Francisco Giants coaches
Tri-City Triplets players
American expatriate baseball people in South Korea
American expatriate baseball people in Venezuela